Joe Barral (born 26 June 1945) is a Monegasque former sports shooter. He competed at the 1968, 1972 and the 1976 Summer Olympics.

References

1945 births
Living people
Monegasque male sport shooters
Olympic shooters of Monaco
Shooters at the 1968 Summer Olympics
Shooters at the 1972 Summer Olympics
Shooters at the 1976 Summer Olympics